Lake Taylorville is a 1,200-acre (4.8 km²) reservoir located in Christian County, Illinois.  Created in 1962 by damming the South Fork of Illinois's Sangamon River, it was built for water supply and recreation purposes.  The lake is 6.5 miles (10.5 km) long and 0.4 miles (0.6 km) wide.  The nearest town is Taylorville, Illinois, southeast of Springfield, Illinois.

Lake Taylorville is managed by the city of Taylorville.

As with other Central Illinois reservoirs, Lake Taylorville is troubled by siltation, with an estimated 90,000 tons of silt annually eroding from farms in the lake's South Fork of the Sangamon catchment area and washing into the lake.  The city in 1998 built a low-headed silt dam on Locust Creek, one of the reservoir's tributaries, to reduce lake siltation.

In 2006, Taylorville City Council began to discuss the issue of dredging the lake to remove unwanted silt. The proposal has not been approved yet because of the large sum of money it would cost the city to dredge the lake. If this project were to take place it would be sometime in the fall of 2008 when the summer recreational season is over and before winter arrives.

References

Reservoirs in Illinois
Protected areas of Christian County, Illinois
Bodies of water of Christian County, Illinois
1962 establishments in Illinois